Ever since its founding in 1906, Sporting Clube de Portugal has had 43 presidents serving a total of 51 terms. To elect a president, Sporting Clube de Portugal members (known as Sócios) vote in an Assembleia Geral, a club member's meeting, whenever a president's term comes to an end. The first president was the Viscount of Alvalade and the current one is Frederico Varandas, since 9 September 2018. The longest serving president was João Rocha, whose presidency lasted for thirteen consecutive years from 1973 to 1986, while the shortest presidency was that of Valadão Chagas, who stepped down on 30 March 1973, the day after he was elected.

List of presidents

This is a list of all the presidents of Sporting Club de Portugal.

References

 
Presidents